The Singapore Treaty on the Law of Trademarks was adopted in Singapore on 28 March 2006. It entered into force on 16 March 2009, following the ratification or accession of ten countries, namely Singapore, Switzerland, Bulgaria, Romania, Denmark, Latvia, Kyrgyzstan, United States, Moldova, and Australia. The treaty establishes common standards for procedural aspects of trademark registration and licensing.

As of August 2020, there are 51 contracting parties to the treaty, which includes 49 states plus the African Intellectual Property Organization and the Benelux Organization for Intellectual Property.

References

External links 
 Singapore Treaty on the Law of Trademarks in the WIPO Lex database — official website of WIPO.
 The full text of the Singapore Treaty on the Law of Trademarks 

Treaties concluded in 2006
Treaties entered into force in 2009
Trademark legislation
World Intellectual Property Organization treaties
2006 in Singapore
Treaties of Armenia
Treaties of Australia
Treaties of Belarus
Treaties of Belgium
Treaties of Benin
Treaties of Bulgaria
Treaties of Canada
Treaties of Croatia
Treaties of Denmark
Treaties of Estonia
Treaties of Finland
Treaties of France
Treaties of Germany
Treaties of Iceland
Treaties of Iraq
Treaties of Ireland
Treaties of Italy
Treaties of Kazakhstan
Treaties of Kyrgyzstan
Treaties of Latvia
Treaties of Liechtenstein
Treaties of Lithuania
Treaties of Luxembourg
Treaties of Mali
Treaties of Mongolia
Treaties of the Netherlands
Treaties of New Zealand
Treaties of North Korea
Treaties of Poland
Treaties of Moldova
Treaties of Romania
Treaties of Russia
Treaties of Serbia
Treaties of Singapore
Treaties of Slovakia
Treaties of South Korea
Treaties of Spain
Treaties of Sweden
Treaties of Switzerland
Treaties of North Macedonia
Treaties of Tajikistan
Treaties of Trinidad and Tobago
Treaties of Ukraine
Treaties of the United Kingdom
Treaties of the United States
Treaties of Uruguay
Treaties entered into by the African Intellectual Property Organization
Treaties entered into by the Benelux Organization for Intellectual Property
Treaties extended to the Netherlands Antilles
Treaties extended to the Isle of Man